The European Qualifiers for men's football competitions at the 1984 Summer Olympics to be held in Los Angeles. The tournament took place from 2 March 1983 to 25 April 1984 including a preliminary round. 

The Soviet Union, East Germany and Poland qualified, but then withdrew. West Germany, Norway, Yugoslavia, and France entered in their place.

Group A

Group B

Group C

Preliminary play-off

|}

Group stage

Group D

Subgroup 1

Subgroup 2

Group final

|}

Notes

References

External links 
Games of the XXIV. Olympiad - European Football Qualifying Tournament (Seoul, South Korea, 1988) - Rec.Sport.Soccer Statistics Foundation

Football qualification for the 1984 Summer Olympics
Football at the Summer Olympics – Men's European Qualifiers